Sumner Lee Trussell (1860 – October 22, 1931) was a judge of the United States Board of Tax Appeals (later the United States Tax Court) from 1924 until his death in 1931.

Born in Minnesota, Trussell received a B.A. from the University of Minnesota and a law degree from Columbia Law School, entering the practice of law in 1885. Trussell joined the Internal Revenue Department in 1889, In 1894 he returned to private practice, returning to government in 1898, and to private practice again in 1916. While again working as a Minneapolis lawyer, he was appointed to the Board of Tax Appeals by President Calvin Coolidge, and was one of the original twelve members appointed to the Board, one of seven appointed "from the public".

Trussell died while on vacation in Sisseton, South Dakota, and was buried in Champlin, Minnesota.

References

Members of the United States Board of Tax Appeals
United States Article I federal judges appointed  by Calvin Coolidge
1860 births
1931 deaths
University of Minnesota alumni
Columbia Law School alumni